The 1983 U.S. Pro Tennis Championships was a men's tennis tournament played on outdoor green clay courts at the Longwood Cricket Club in Chestnut Hill, Massachusetts in the United States. The event was part of the Super Series of the 1983 Volvo Grand Prix circuit. It was the 56th edition of the tournament and was held from July 11 through July 17, 1983. Second-seeded José Luis Clerc won the singles title, his second at the event after 1981.

Finals

Singles
 José Luis Clerc defeated  Jimmy Arias 6–3, 6–1
 It was Clerc's 4th singles title of the year and the 16th of his career.

Doubles
 Mark Dickson /  Cássio Motta defeated  Hans Gildemeister /  Belus Prajoux 7–5, 6–3

References

External links
 ITF tournament edition details
 Longwood Cricket Club – list of U.S. Pro Champions

U.S. Pro Tennis Championships
U.S. Pro Championships
U.S. Pro Championships
U.S. Pro Championships
U.S. Pro Championships
Chestnut Hill, Massachusetts
Clay court tennis tournaments
History of Middlesex County, Massachusetts
Sports in Middlesex County, Massachusetts
Tennis tournaments in Massachusetts
Tourist attractions in Middlesex County, Massachusetts